The Twin Bridge is a historic structure located in Twin Bridge Park southwest of Fayette, Iowa, United States. The Fayette County Board of Supervisors contracted with N. M. Stark and Company of Des Moines to build almost all of its bridges between 1900 and 1913. This concrete Luten arch bridge was completed in about 1910 using a patented design by Indianapolis engineer Daniel Luten. Stark was a licensee for Luten and they built multiple bridges using his designs under a patent royalty agreement. The Twin Bridge was listed on the National Register of Historic Places in 1998.

See also

List of bridges documented by the Historic American Engineering Record in Iowa

References

External links

Bridges completed in 1910
Bridges in Fayette County, Iowa
Historic American Engineering Record in Iowa
National Register of Historic Places in Fayette County, Iowa
Road bridges on the National Register of Historic Places in Iowa
Arch bridges in Iowa
Concrete bridges in the United States